Newton Corner is one of the thirteen villages within the city of Newton in Middlesex County, Massachusetts, United States. Newton Corner borders Brighton, a neighborhood of Boston, as well as the city of Watertown, Massachusetts. Newton Corner is divided by the Massachusetts Turnpike (I-90), it has on-off access in both directions at Exit 17.

Newton Corner station formerly saw streetcar and commuter rail service; it now serves as a busy bus depot serving downtown express routes as well as local buses.

History
Newton Corner sprang up in the late 1600s, when a village grew at the intersection of Washington and Centre street, then rural roads. Stores, farm stands, and a tavern came to service the steady stream of traffic. A railway came through in 1834.

The Massachusetts Turnpike was built through the center of Newton Corner in the 1960s, along the line of the former railroad, despite opposition from the City of Newton. An interchange was also added. This drastically changed the nature of the village center, splitting it in two, tearing down one-third of the businesses, and eviscerating the existing street patterns. Newton Corner remains in the twenty-first century rent in two by the deep cut of the turnpike and dominated by the heavy traffic and complicated ramp and road patterns at the interchange, with little pedestrian traffic or intercourse between the two separated halves. According to author Yanni Tsipis, "Newton Corner really ceased to be a to-place. It became more of a through-place".

Education
Underwood Elementary School (public) – 101 Vernon Street
Bigelow Middle School (public) – 42 Vernon Street
Lincoln-Eliot Elementary School (public) – 191 Pearl Street
Newton Country Day School (private) – 785 Centre Street

The Chamberlayne School, now Mount Ida College, was founded in 1899 as a private all-female high school on Mount Ida Hill in Newton Corner.

Notable residents
 Freelan Oscar Stanley and Francis Edgar Stanley, identical twin inventors of the Stanley Steam Car
 Robert Pinsky, former US Poet Laureate
 Sidewalk Sam (Robert Guillemin), folk artist
 Taylor Twellman, soccer player
 Steve Grossman, Massachusetts state treasurer, 2011–present

See also
List of Registered Historic Places in Newton, Massachusetts

References

External links
  Newton Corner Neighborhoods

Villages in Newton, Massachusetts
Villages in Massachusetts